Jack Hawkins (born 21 May 1954) is a former Australian rules footballer who played 182 games for Geelong from 1973 to 1981. He is the father of current Geelong forward Tom Hawkins.  

Hawkins made his Victorian Football League (VFL) debut against Collingwood in Round 3 1973 and immediately became a leading player for Geelong.

Hawkins had his most successful season in 1976, playing 24 games and polling 22 Brownlow Medal votes, finishing twelfth behind winner Graham Moss.   

Hawkins was known as 'Jumping Jack' for his incredible vertical leap when jumping for a mark. He also won the State High Jump competition.

Hawkins' brothers Michael and Robb Hawkins also both played for Geelong, but each for just a single season.  Jack's wife, Jennie, is the daughter of another former Geelong player, Fred Le Deux.

References

External links

1954 births
Geelong Football Club players
Australian rules footballers from New South Wales
Finley Football Club players
Living people
People educated at Melbourne Grammar School